Salvelinus obtusus, commonly called the blunt-nosed Irish charr or blunt-snouted Irish char,  is a species of lacustrine char fish in the family Salmonidae, found in the Lakes of Killarney, Ireland.

Taxonomy

Name

The English word "char[r]" is thought to derive from Old Irish ceara/cera meaning "[blood] red," referring to its pink-red underside. This would also connect with its Welsh name torgoch, "red belly."

The species name obtusus is Latin for "blunt."

Biology

It is distinguished from other Salvelinus in Ireland by its obtuse snout, rounded dorsal profile and short lower jaw, which is included in the upper jaw when the mouth is closed. Its body depth is 20–25% of snout length.

Range

Salvelinus obtusus is only found in Muckross Lake and Lough Leane, and is threatened by eutrophication.

It was formerly found in Lough Tay, Lough Dan, Lough Nalughraman and Lough Acoose, but is now considered extirpated at those sites and is critically endangered.

References 

obtusus
Endemic freshwater fish of Ireland
Salvelinus obtusus